Boxing at the 2019 Southeast Asian Games in the Philippines was held at the Philippine International Convention Center Forum in Pasay, Metro Manila from 4 to 9 December 2019.

Host Philippines emerged as the overall champion for the first time since 2005 after winning seven gold, three silver and two bronze medals. Twelve of 13 Filipino entries went on to win medals with Olympians Rogen Ladon and Charly Suarez and 2019 AIBA World Championships silver medalist Eumir Marcial leading the way.

World champions Josie Gabuco and Nesthy Petecio led the women’s squad with a gold medal apiece. Gabuco won a record fifth SEA Games gold medal while Petecio finally tasted success after being denied the top prize in 2013 and 2015. The only Filipino fighter who failed to bring home a medal was defending light heavyweight champion John Marvin, who lost to Vietnam’s Truong Dinh Hoang in the quarterfinals. Marvin was knocked down in the first round and went on to lose the bout via split decision.

Thailand, led by Chatchai Butdee and Wuttichai Masuk, finished second overall with five gold medals. Vietnam was the only other nation to win a gold medal in boxing, courtesy of Nguyen Thi Tam in the women’s flyweight division.

Participation

Participating nations

Medalists

Men

Women

Medal table

Results

Men’s Light Flyweight (49kg)

Men’s Flyweight (51kg)

Men’s Bantamweight (56kg)

Men’s Lightweight (60kg)

Men’s Light Welterweight (64kg)

Men’s Welterweight (69kg)

Men’s Middleweight (75kg)

Men's Light Heavyweight (81kg)

Women’s Light Flyweight (48kg)

Women’s Flyweight (51kg)

Women’s Bantamweight (54kg)

Women’s Featherweight (57kg)

Women’s Lightweight (60kg)

References

External links
 
 SEA Games: Filipino boxers edge rival Thais to emerge as kings of the ring. ABS-CBN News. 9 December 2019. Accessed 11 December 2019.
 Petecio breaks jinx, exacts revenge. Philippine Star. 10 December 2019. Accessed 11 December 2019. 
SEA Games: Paalam gets redemption as he wins first boxing gold. Philippine Daily Inquirer. 9 December 2019. Accessed 11 December 2019.
SEA Games: Stronger Thai fighter denies Marjon Piañar welterweight gold. ABS-CBN News. 9 December 2019. Accessed 11 December 2019.

2019
Southeast Asian Games
2019 Southeast Asian Games events